Badnapur is a town and a tehsil in Jalna subdivision of Jalna district  in the state of Maharashtra, India.

Badnapur is Commonly famous for Farmer's and Noor Hospital, it is a private Hospital which provide free facilities.

It has a railway station on the Manmad - Aurangabad - Hyderabad route.

History
It was here in 1803 that Arthur Wellesley and James Stevenson met prior to the Battle of Assaye.

Cities and towns in Jalna district
Talukas in Maharashtra